Mikel Hoxha (born 24 May 1997) is an Albanian professional footballer who plays as a defender for Albanian club Luftëtari Gjirokastër.

Club career

Early career
Hoxha started his youth career with a local team of Partizani Tirana named Lapraka at age of 14. After spending 3 years here, he moved at Partizani Tirana youth levels, where he remained for 2 years before he signed with Sopoti Librazhd where he managed to make his professional debut during the 2016–17 season where he played 7 league matches in the Albanian Second Division and 1 other match in the Albanian Cup.

Besa Kavajë
On 4 January 2018 Hoxha was loaned out to Besa Kavajë in the Albanian First Division.

International career
Hoxha received his first international call up at the Albania national under-21 football team by coach Alban Bushi for a gathering between 14–17 May 2017 with most of the players selected from Albanian championships.

Career statistics

Club

References

External links
Mikel Hoxha profile FSHF.org

1997 births
Living people
Footballers from Tirana
Albanian footballers
Association football defenders
Albania youth international footballers
Albania under-21 international footballers
KS Sopoti Librazhd players
Luftëtari Gjirokastër players
Besa Kavajë players
Kategoria e Dytë players
Kategoria e Parë players
Kategoria Superiore players